Afrikan New Style is the debut studio album by singer from the Democratic Republic of the Congo, currently residing in France, Jessy Matador. It was released on 24 November 2008. It peaked to number 93 on the French Albums Chat.

Singles
"Décalé Gwada" was the first single released from the album; it was released on 23 June 2008; it reached number 14 on the French Singles Chart.
"Mini Kawoulé" was the second single released from the album; it was released on 2 February 2009; it reached number 16 on the French Singles Chart.

Track listing

Chart performance

Release history

References

Jessy Matador albums
2008 albums